The Toda lattice, introduced by , is a simple model for a one-dimensional crystal in solid state physics. It is famous because it is one of the earliest examples of a non-linear completely integrable system.

It is given by a chain of particles with nearest neighbor interaction, described by the Hamiltonian

and the equations of motion

where  is the displacement of the -th particle from its equilibrium position,

and the Toda potential .

Soliton solutions 
Soliton solutions are solitary waves spreading in time with no change to their shape and size and interacting with each other in a particle-like way. The general N-soliton solution of the equation is

where

with

where
 
and
.

Integrability 
The Toda lattice is a prototypical example of a completely integrable system. To see this one uses Flaschka's variables

such that the Toda lattice reads

To show that the system is completely integrable, it suffices to find a Lax pair, that is, two operators L(t) and P(t) in the Hilbert space of square summable sequences  such that the Lax equation

(where [L, P] = LP - PL is the Lie commutator of the two operators) is equivalent to the time derivative of Flaschka's variables. The choice

where f(n+1) and f(n-1) are the shift operators, implies that the operators L(t) for different t are unitarily equivalent. 

The matrix  has the property that its eigenvalues are invariant in time. These eigenvalues constitute independent integrals of motion, therefore the Toda lattice is completely integrable.
In particular, the Toda lattice can be solved by virtue of the inverse scattering transform for the Jacobi operator L. The main result implies that arbitrary (sufficiently fast) decaying initial conditions asymptotically for large t split into a sum of solitons and a decaying dispersive part.

See also 
 Lax pair
 Lie bialgebra
 Poisson–Lie group

References

 

 
Eugene Gutkin, Integrable Hamiltonians with Exponential Potential, Physica 16D (1985)  398-404.

External links
 E. W. Weisstein, Toda Lattice at ScienceWorld
 G. Teschl, The Toda Lattice
 J Phys A Special issue on fifty years of the Toda lattice

Exactly solvable models
Integrable systems
Solitons